Aleksander Rei (24 January 1900 Uuemõisa Parish, Saare County – 6 November 1943 Usollag, Perm Oblast) was an Estonian politician. He was a member of the Estonian National Assembly and VI Riigikogu (its Chamber of Deputies).

References

1900 births
1943 deaths
Members of the Estonian National Assembly
Members of the Riigivolikogu
Farmers' Assemblies politicians
Estonian people who died in Soviet detention
Mayors of places in Estonia
People from Saaremaa Parish